"Be Natural" is a remake song recorded by South Korean girl group Red Velvet. Originally recorded and released as a single by S.E.S. in 2000, the song was re-recorded by the then-quartet Red Velvet and released by SM Entertainment as a digital single on October 13, 2014. Written and produced by SM songwriter Yoo Young-jin, the jazz-influenced R&B track was the group's second digital release in 2014, featuring a rap verse from then-SM Rookies Lee Tae-yong, who would later be the leader of South Korean boy group NCT and NCT 127. It also marked as their first single to be released under the "Velvet" concept with a drastic change to a mature, more-sultry image, and also the group's last release as a quartet.

Upon its release, "Be Natural" was regarded as a fan favorite for the group's image and musical diversity. The song, however, only managed to peaked at number 33 on the Gaon Digital Chart. It fared better on the US Billboard World Digital Songs, becoming the group's second top-ten entry within a year as the song reached a peak of number six on the chart.

Background and release
"Be Natural" was originally recorded and released by S.E.S. in 2000, becoming a hit single from their fourth studio album A Letter From Greenland. As part of promotions for SM Entertainment's pre-debut group SM Rookies, which three of the members were a part of, a performance video of "Be Natural" by member Irene and Seulgi (then-known as SR14G) was uploaded onto the label's YouTube channel on July 17, 2014, shortly before the video teaser for "Happiness" 10 days later. The record used in the performance was also re-recorded.

The first teaser was released on October 6, 2014, showing all four girls in suits, hinting at a transition to a more mature concept from their first single, "Happiness". More teasers were released before the group made their comeback stage on M! Countdown on October 9. S.M. Entertainment released the music video for the song on their official YouTube account hours later. The single, on the other hand, wasn't released digitally until October 13.

Composition 
"Be Natural" is mainly an R&B song composed and arranged solely by songwriter Yoo Young-jin, with strong influence from soul and jazz elements. It also contained a rap verse, performed by Hyuggie in the original version and then-SR14B's Taeyong. For the re-recorded version by Red Velvet, the arrangement and rap verse remained the same to the original version by S.E.S., composed in the key of B♭ minor with a tempo of 89 beat-per-minute. Lyrically, the only difference between the two versions is that each rapper says his own name before the rap.

Music video 
The music video was directed by SM performance director, Shim Jae-won, who also worked with renowned choreographer, Kyle Hanagami, for the choreography. The original choreography of the music video was seen in the pre-debut performance of members Irene and Seulgi. The music video includes dynamic movements of camera on which was shot using one-take techniques. It also featured then-SR14B member Taeyong performing the rap verse, instead of not including the rappers in the original video by S.E.S. in 2000.

Live performances 
Following the music video release, Red Velvet began the promotion for "Be Natural" on Mnet's M! Countdown on October 9, followed by performances on Music Bank, Show! Music Core, Inkigayo and Show Champion. The girlgroup would then perform the song again as a dance section during their first concert Red Room in 2017, which also marked their first time performing it as a quintet since member Yeri joined the group shortly after its release in October 2014.

Accolades

Credits and personnel 
Credits adapted from the liner notes of Be Natural.

Studio

 Recorded and mixed at SM Booming System

Personnel

 Red Velvet (Irene, Seulgi, Wendy, Joy) – vocals, background vocals
 Yoo Young-jin – songwriter, brass, recording, mixing
 HYUGGIE – rap
 Won Hyun-jung – background vocals
 Kim Hyo-soo – background vocals
 Groovie K – guitar

 Lee Jung-sik – saxophone
 Lim Jae-pil – trumpet
 Shin Dong-sik – trombone
 Yoo Chang-yong – recording assistant
 Yoo Han-jin – recording assistant

Charts

Weekly charts

Release history

References

Red Velvet (group) songs
Korean-language songs
2014 singles
SM Entertainment singles
2000 songs
2014 songs
Songs written by Yoo Young-jin